The Paseo is an upscale outdoor mall in Pasadena, California, covering three city blocks with office space, shops, restaurants, a movie theater, and 400 loft-style condominiums (called Terrace Apartment Homes) above.

It is located in downtown Pasadena between Colorado Boulevard to the north and Green Street to the south. Paseo Colorado is just east of and connected by a pedestrian bridge, the Garfield Promenade, to Old Town Pasadena, and west of the center of downtown. The mall is located across Green Street from the Pasadena Civic Auditorium in the Pasadena Conference Center. As of 2014, the mall is currently without an anchor retail chain stores since both Macy's and a Gelson's Markets had closed in 2013.

History
The site was originally occupied by a shopping mall called Plaza Pasadena, which opened in 1980 and featured three anchor stores: J.C. Penney, The Broadway, and May Company California. It was built by The Hahn Company at a cost of $115 million on an 11-acre site and had featured over 120 stores. The development was designed by Charles Kober & Associates and the resulting design was awarded a Progressive Architecture Magazine Design Award in 1979.

This mall did not live up to expectations. May Company closed its store there in 1989, and the space was divided among smaller stores.

In 1998, following the conversion of the Broadway store to Macy's and the closure of J.C. Penney, the developers announced plans to tear down the mall and replace it with an outdoor center.

Paseo Colorado opened in September 2001, retaining the Macy's store from the original development and added a supermarket and movie theater complex.  Two years later, the outdoor center was sold to Developers Diversified Realty Corp. for $114 million.

In November 2010, the Paseo Colorado saw the opening of Noor, a 16,000 sq ft event space featuring state-of-the-art audio/visual and lighting and seating for up to 350 guests for banquets in its large ballroom, the Sofia, and 140 guests for banquets in its smaller ballroom, the Ella.

On January 3, 2013, Macy's announced their store at Paseo Colorado would close in early spring 2013. At the time of the store closure, there were plans to demolish the Macy's building and replace it with a multi-story hotel.

In March 2013, Gelson's announced that they would close their store at Paseo Colorado on July 21, 2013. This store had been at this location since Paseo Colorado first opened 12 years prior.

By late 2014, the mall was in the process of obtaining the necessary local governmental licenses to replace the vacant Macy's Department Store with a Hyatt Place hotel and mixed-use condominium complex. After obtaining the necessary permits, DDR began the demolition process in August 2015.

In January 2016, DDR sold the retail development to Cypress Equities of Dallas.

It was renamed The Paseo in 2017.

References

External links
 

Residential condominiums in the United States
Buildings and structures in Pasadena, California
Shopping malls in the San Gabriel Valley
Shopping malls established in 1980
Tourist attractions in Pasadena, California